Sibuyiselwe Angela Buthelezi (born 1969) is a South African member of the National Assembly of South Africa from the Inkatha Freedom Party.

Personal life 
Her father is Mangosuthu Buthelezi.

References

See also 

Living people
1969 births
Inkatha Freedom Party politicians
Members of the National Assembly of South Africa
21st-century South African women politicians
21st-century South African politicians
Zulu people
South African Anglicans
Zulu royalty
Women members of the National Assembly of South Africa